It Runs in the Family is a 2003 American comedy-drama film directed by Fred Schepisi and starring three generations of the Douglas family: Kirk Douglas, his son Michael Douglas, and Michael's son Cameron Douglas, who play three generations of a family. Diana Douglas ( Dill), real-life mother to Michael Douglas and ex-wife of Kirk, plays Kirk's character's wife. Joel Douglas, second son of Kirk and Diana, was the associate producer.

Plot
The story involves the highly successful New York City Gromberg family. Each member has their own set of problems. The father-son relationship difficulties are highlighted. Mitchell Gromberg is dealing with health problems resulting from a stroke. His son Alex works as a lawyer in the firm that his father founded, but he questions the usefulness of his work and his place in the family. Alex's son, Asher, does not take college seriously and seems lost. The youngest son is 11 year old Eli, who is extremely intelligent, while being socially awkward and is entering a difficult pre-adolescent time.

Alex indulges in a thoughtless and careless brief romantic fling with Suzie at the soup kitchen where they volunteer. Psychologist wife Rebecca discovers panties and it threatens their marriage. When Evelyn Gromberg, Mitchell's wife and Alex's mother dies, the family comes together to heal. At Evelyn's funeral in suburban New York, Rebecca tells Alex that she knows about his romantic fling. Alex, Mitchell and Asher go fishing to talk about old wounds but nothing gets resolved.

At college Asher is discovered with illegal drugs. Although devastated, Rebecca and Alex are supportive parents and vow to get help for Asher. He wants his girlfriend Peg protected. Mitchell's older brother Stephen dies. Alex and Mitchell give him a fine send-off and farewell. Back at home Alex is forced to sleep on the living room couch but Rebecca agrees to reconciliation terms.

Cast

Michael Douglas as Alex Gromberg
Kirk Douglas as Mitchell Gromberg
Rory Culkin as Eli Gromberg
Cameron Douglas as Asher Gromberg
Diana Dill aka Diana Douglas as Evelyn Gromberg
Bernadette Peters as Rebecca Gromberg
Michelle Monaghan as Peg Maloney
Geoffrey Arend as Malik
Sarita Choudhury as Suzie
Irene Gorovaia as Abby Staley
Annie Golden as Deb
Mark Hammer as Stephen Gromberg
Audra McDonald as Sarah Langley
Josh Pais as Barney
Louie Torrellas as Jeremy
Adrian Martinez as Mitchell's Doorman

Production
In his role as producer, Michael Douglas suggested his mother (Diana Dill), Rory Culkin, and Bernadette Peters for their roles. Fred Schepisi noted that they were originally considering Sigourney Weaver for the part of Michael's wife. "Bernadette [Peters] was a really nice balance, playing straighter than you’d usually see her play..."

Total gross was $7,491,839.

Reception
On Rotten Tomatoes, the film has an approval rating of 28% and an average rating of 4.5/10. The site's consensus states, "Despite its gimmick casting, the movie ultimately goes nowhere." Critic Steven Holden wrote in The New York Times that the film is a "surprisingly complex and subtle portrait", and "Besides its laudable reluctance to tie up loose ends, the most courageous thing about It Runs in the Family is its refusal to try to make you love its aggressive, strong-willed characters." Roger Ebert wrote: "But the movie is simply not clear about where it wants to go and what it wants to do. It is heavy on episode and light on insight, and although it takes courage to bring up touchy topics it would have taken more to treat them frankly."

See also
 List of films featuring diabetes

References

External links
 
 
 

2003 films
2003 comedy-drama films
American comedy-drama films
Films about dysfunctional families
Films shot in New York (state)
Films shot in New Jersey
Metro-Goldwyn-Mayer films
Films distributed by Disney
Films directed by Fred Schepisi
Films produced by Michael Douglas
Douglas family
Films about father–son relationships
2000s English-language films
2000s American films